Uberlândia Tênis Clube is a Brazilian professional basketball team from Uberlândia, Minas Gerais, Brazil. It is also known as Unitri/Uberlândia, due to a partnership with the university Unitri, which is located in Uberlândia. Unitri/Uberlândia is one of the teams of the Novo Basquete Brasil (NBB), the top-tier level Brazilian basketball league.

History
Unitri/Uberlândia was founded in 1998, with the arrival of the head coach Ary Vidal and since its foundation, the team receives financial support from the university Unitri. In 2004, the team from Minas Gerais won its first title, winning the Brazilian Championship. They beat Flamengo in the league's finals, 3–0. In 2005, when Uberlândia defended its national title, the team was defeated by Telemar/Rio de Janeiro, where the small forward Marcelinho Machado played.

Two years later, Unitri was eliminated in the league's semifinal series by Franca. In the 2010–11 and 2011–12 NBB seasons, the team was defeated in the league's quarterfinals playoff series, by Brasília and Flamengo, respectively.

Roster

Honors and titles

Continental
 FIBA South American League
 Champions (1): 2005
 Runners-up (1): 2004
 South American Club Championship
 Runners-up (1): 2005

National
 Brazilian Championship
 Champions (1): 2004
 Runners-up (3): 2003, 2005, 2013

Regional
 Minas Gerais State League
 Champions (14): 1998, 1999, 2000, 2001, 2002, 2003, 2004, 2005, 2006, 2010, 2011, 2012, 2013, 2014

Head coaches
 Ary Ventura Vidal
 Milton "Carioquinha" Setrini
 Hélio Rubens Garcia
 Ricardo "Cadum" Guimarães
 Ênio Ângelo Vecchi
 André "Ratto" Luís Guimarães Fonseca

References

External links
Official blog 
Latinbasket.com Team Profile

Basketball teams in Brazil
Novo Basquete Brasil